The year 1974 in film involved some significant events.

Highest-grossing films (U.S.)

The top ten 1974 released films by box office gross in North America are as follows:

Events
February 7 – Blazing Saddles is released in the United States.
May 28 - Joseph E. Levine, the founder of Embassy Pictures, resigns as president.
June 20 – Chinatown, directed by Roman Polanski and featured Jack Nicholson, Faye Dunaway, and John Huston, is released to worldwide critical acclaim.
November 1 – Technicolor ceases its legendary dye-transfer printing process.
November 8 – Frank Yablans announces his resignation as president of Paramount Pictures with effect from January 5, 1975 following Barry Diller earlier becoming chairman and chief executive office.
Metro-Goldwyn-Mayer celebrated its fiftieth anniversary with big fanfare, including That's Entertainment!, a retrospective documentary celebrating its prestigious musicals (e.g. The Wizard of Oz, Singin' in the Rain, Meet Me in St. Louis, Gigi, An American in Paris, Seven Brides for Seven Brothers).
October–December – Three "disaster films" are released in three consecutive months:  Airport 1975, Earthquake, and The Towering Inferno respectively.  All were box office successes.
Kevin Costner made his film debut in Sizzle Beach, U.S.A., although the film was not released until 1986.

Awards

Palme d'Or (Cannes Film Festival):
The Conversation, directed by Francis Ford Coppola, United States

Golden Bear (Berlin Film Festival):
The Apprenticeship of Duddy Kravitz, directed by Ted Kotcheff, Canada

Notable films released in 1974
United States unless stated

The 6 Ultra Brothers vs. the Monster Army (Urutora Roku Kyōdai tai Kaijū Gundan) – (Japan/Thailand)
11 Harrowhouse, starring Charles Grodin, Candice Bergen, James Mason
36 Ghante, starring Raaj Kumar and Sunil Dutt – (India)
99 and 44/100% Dead, starring Richard Harris, Ann Turkel, Edmond O'Brien, Chuck Connors

A
Aap Ki Kasam, starring Rajesh Khanna and Mumtaz – (India)
Abby, starring William Marshall
A Performance of Hamlet in the Village of Mrdusa Donja (Predstava Hamleta u Mrduši Donjoj) – (Yugoslavia)
Aina (The Mirror) – (Pakistan)
Airport 1975, starring Charlton Heston, Karen Black, George Kennedy, Efrem Zimbalist Jr., Susan Clark, Helen Reddy, Myrna Loy, Gloria Swanson
Ali: Fear Eats the Soul (Angst essen Seele auf), directed by Rainer Werner Fassbinder – (West Germany)
Alice Doesn't Live Here Anymore, directed by Martin Scorsese, starring Ellen Burstyn, Kris Kristofferson, Harvey Keitel, Alfred Lutter, Jodie Foster
Alice in the Cities (Alice in den Städten), directed by Wim Wenders – (West Germany)
Alien Thunder, starring Donald Sutherland
All the Kind Strangers, directed by Burt Kennedy, starring Stacy Keach and Samantha Eggar
Allonsanfàn, starring Marcello Mastroianni – (Italy)
Almost Human (Milano odia: la polizia non può sparare), starring Tomas Milian and Henry Silva – (Italy)
And Now My Love (Toute une vie), directed by Claude Lelouch, starring Marthe Keller – (France)
And Then There Were None, starring Richard Attenborough, Charles Aznavour, Gert Fröbe, Herbert Lom, Oliver Reed, Adolfo Celi, Elke Sommer
Animals Are Beautiful People – (South Africa)
Angkur (The Seedling) – (India)
The Apprenticeship of Duddy Kravitz, directed by Ted Kotcheff, starring Richard Dreyfuss – Golden Bear winner – (Canada)
Arabian Nights (Il fiore delle mille e una notte), directed by Pier Paolo Pasolini – (Italy)
At Home Among Strangers (Svoy sredi chuzhikh, chuzhoy sredi svoikh) – (U.S.S.R.)
The Autobiography of Miss Jane Pittman (made for TV), starring Cicely Tyson

B
Barry McKenzie Holds His Own, starring Barry Crocker and Barry Humphries – (Australia)
The Beast Must Die, starring Peter Cushing – (U.K.)
Benji, starring Patsy Garrett
Big Bad Mama, starring Angie Dickinson
Billy Two Hats, starring Gregory Peck and Desi Arnaz Jr.
Black Belt Jones, starring Jim Kelly
Black Christmas (a.k.a. Silent Night, Evil Night), starring Olivia Hussey, Margot Kidder, Keir Dullea – (Canada)
The Black Windmill, starring Michael Caine and Janet Suzman – (U.K.)
Blazing Saddles, directed by Mel Brooks, starring Gene Wilder, Cleavon Little, Harvey Korman, Madeline Kahn, Slim Pickens, Alex Karras
Blood for Dracula (Andy Warhol's Dracula), directed by Paul Morrissey
Bread and Chocolate (Pane e cioccolata), starring Nino Manfredi – (Italy)
Bring Me the Head of Alfredo Garcia, directed by Sam Peckinpah, starring Warren Oates, Isela Vega, Gig Young, Robert Webber
Buster and Billie, starring Jan-Michael Vincent
Butley, directed by Harold Pinter, starring Alan Bates and Jessica Tandy – (U.K.)

C
Caged Heat, directorial debut of Jonathan Demme
California Split, directed by Robert Altman, starring George Segal, Elliott Gould, Ann Prentiss
Callan, starring Edward Woodward – (U.K.)
Carry On Dick, starring Sid James and Barbara Windsor – (U.K.)
The Cars that Ate Paris, directorial debut of Peter Weir – (Australia)
The Castaway Cowboy, directed by Vincent McEveety, starring James Garner, Vera Miles, Eric Shea, and Robert Culp
Celine and Julie Go Boating (Céline et Julie vont en bateau), directed by Jacques Rivette – (France)
Chinatown, directed by Roman Polanski, starring Jack Nicholson and Faye Dunaway – Golden Globe Awards for Best Picture, Director and Actor
Claudine, starring Diahann Carroll and James Earl Jones
The Clockmaker (L' Horloger de Saint-Paul), directed by Bertrand Tavernier, starring Philippe Noiret and Jean Rochefort – (France)
Closed Mondays (animated short) - Academy Awards for Best Animated Short Film
Cockfighter, starring Warren Oates and Harry Dean Stanton
Conrack, directed by Martin Ritt, starring Jon Voight
The Conscript (De loteling) – (Belgium)
The Conversation, directed by Francis Ford Coppola, starring Gene Hackman, John Cazale, Cindy Williams, Frederic Forrest, Teri Garr, Harrison Ford
Conversation Piece (Gruppo di famiglia in un interno), directed by Luchino Visconti, starring Burt Lancaster – (Italy)
Crazy Joe, starring Peter Boyle, Paula Prentiss, Eli Wallach
The Crazy World of Julius Vrooder, starring Timothy Bottoms and Barbara Hershey

D
Daisy Miller, directed by Peter Bogdanovich, starring Cybill Shepherd and Barry Brown
Dark Star, directed by John Carpenter, starring Dan O'Bannon
Death Wish, directed by Michael Winner, starring Charles Bronson, Vincent Gardenia, Hope Lange
The Deluge (Potop) – (Poland)
Dirty Mary, Crazy Larry, starring Peter Fonda and Susan George
Dost (Friend), starring Dharmendra – (India)
Drama of the Rich (Fatti di gente perbene), starring Giancarlo Giannini and Catherine Deneuve – (Italy)

E
Earthquake, directed by Mark Robson, starring Charlton Heston, Ava Gardner, George Kennedy, Richard Roundtree, Geneviève Bujold, Victoria Principal
Edvard Munch – (Norway/Sweden)
Effi Briest, directed by Rainer Werner Fassbinder, starring Hanna Schygulla – (West Germany)
Electra, My Love (Szerelmem, Elektra), directed by Miklós Jancsó – (Hungary)
Emmanuelle, starring Sylvia Kristel – (France)
The Enigma of Kaspar Hauser (a.k.a. Every Man For Himself and God Against All), directed by Werner Herzog – (West Germany)

F
F for Fake (originally Vérités et Mensonges), directed by and starring Orson Welles – (France/West Germany/Iran)
Female Trouble, directed by John Waters, starring Divine
Five Shaolin Masters (Shao Lin wu zu), directed by Chang Cheh – (Hong Kong)
Flesh for Frankenstein (Andy Warhol's Frankenstein), directed by Paul Morrissey
For Pete's Sake, starring Barbra Streisand
The Four Musketeers (a.k.a. The Four Musketeers: Milady's Revenge), starring Michael York, Oliver Reed, Frank Finlay, Richard Chamberlain – (U.K.)
Foxy Brown, starring Pam Grier
Freebie and the Bean, starring James Caan and Alan Arkin
The Front Page, directed by Billy Wilder, starring Jack Lemmon, Walter Matthau, Susan Sarandon, Carol Burnett

G
The Gambler, directed by Karel Reisz, starring James Caan, Lauren Hutton, Paul Sorvino
Gavaznha (The Deer) – (Iran)
General Idi Amin Dada: A Self Portrait (Général Idi Amin Dada: Autoportrait), a documentary film by Barbet Schroeder – (France/Switzerland)
Ginger in the Morning, starring Sissy Spacek
The Girl from Petrovka, starring Goldie Hawn, Hal Holbrook, Anthony Hopkins
The Godfather Part II, directed by Francis Ford Coppola, starring Al Pacino, Robert Duvall, Robert De Niro, John Cazale, Diane Keaton, Talia Shire, Michael V. Gazzo, Lee Strasberg
Godzilla vs. Mechagodzilla, directed by Jun Fukuda – (Japan)
Going Places (Les Valseuses), directed by Bertrand Blier, starring Gérard Depardieu, Miou-Miou, Jeanne Moreau – (France)
Gold, starring Roger Moore and Susannah York
Golden Needles, starring Joe Don Baker and Elizabeth Ashley
The Golden Voyage of Sinbad, starring John Phillip Law and Tom Baker with special effects by Ray Harryhausen – (U.K.)
Gone in 60 Seconds, directed by and starring H. B. Halicki
Great Expectations, starring Michael York, Sarah Miles, James Mason – (U.S./U.K.)
The Great Gatsby, directed by Jack Clayton, starring Robert Redford, Mia Farrow, Sam Waterston, Bruce Dern, Lois Chiles, Karen Black
La Gueule ouverte (The Mouth Agape), directed by Maurice Pialat – (France)

H
Harry and Tonto, directed by Paul Mazursky, starring Art Carney, Herbert Berghof, Larry Hagman, Ellen Burstyn
Hearts and Minds, directed by Peter Davis – Academy Award for Best Documentary Feature
Herbie Rides Again, starring Helen Hayes, Stefanie Powers, Ken Berry
Heroes Two (Fang Shiyu yu Hong Xiguan), directed by Chang Cheh – (Hong Kong)
The Holy Office (El santo oficio) – (Mexico)
The Homeless (Yadonashi) – (Japan)
Hotel Angel (Theptida rong ram) – (Thailand)

I
In Summer We Must Love, starring Salah Zulfikar – (Egypt)
The Internecine Project, starring James Coburn and Lee Grant – (U.K.)
The Island at the Top of the World, starring David Hartman and Donald Sinden
It's Alive, starring John P. Ryan and Sharon Farrell

J
Jáchyme, hoď ho do stroje! (Joachim, Put It in the Machine) – (Czechoslovakia)
Jock Petersen, starring Jack Thompson – (Australia)
Journey Back to Oz
Juggernaut, starring Richard Harris, Omar Sharif, Anthony Hopkins – (U.K.)
A Jungle Book of Regulations (Nie ma rózy bez ognia) – (Poland)

K
Karafuto 1945 Summer Hyosetsu no Mon – (Japan)
The Klansman, directed by Terence Young, starring Lee Marvin and Richard Burton
Kunwara Baap, directed by and starring Mehmood – (India)

L
Lacombe, Lucien, directed by Louis Malle, starring Pierre Blaise and Aurore Clément – (France)
Ladies and Gentlemen: The Rolling Stones, a concert film
Lancelot du Lac, directed by Robert Bresson – (France)
Lemora, directed by Richard Blackburn, starring Cheryl Smith and Lesley Gilb.
Lenny, a biopic of Lenny Bruce, directed by Bob Fosse, starring Dustin Hoffman and Valerie Perrine
Little House on the Prairie
The Life and Times of Grizzly Adams, starring Dan Haggerty
The Longest Yard (a.k.a. The Mean Machine), directed by Robert Aldrich, starring Burt Reynolds, Eddie Albert, Ed Lauter, Michael Conrad, Richard Kiel
The Lords of Flatbush, starring Perry King, Sylvester Stallone, Henry Winkler
Lost in the Stars, starring Brock Peters, Melba Moore, Clifton Davis
Lovin' Molly, starring Blythe Danner, Anthony Perkins, Beau Bridges
Luther, a biopic of Martin Luther, starring Stacy Keach – (U.K./U.S./Canada)

M
Macon County Line, starring Max Baer Jr.
Madhouse, starring Vincent Price
Mahler, a biopic of Gustav Mahler directed by Ken Russell – (U.K.)
Majboor (Compulsed) – (India)
Mame, directed by Gene Saks, starring Lucille Ball, Beatrice Arthur, Robert Preston
Man on a Swing, directed by Frank Perry, starring Cliff Robertson, Joel Grey, Dorothy Tristan, Elizabeth Wilson, George Voskovec
The Man Who Sleeps (Un homme qui dort) – (France) – winner of the Prix Jean Vigo
The Man with the Golden Gun, directed by Guy Hamilton, starring Roger Moore (as James Bond), with Christopher Lee and Britt Ekland – (U.K.)
The Mark of Zorro
The Marseille Contract, starring Michael Caine, James Mason, Anthony Quinn
Mashti Mamdali's Car by Reza Fazeli (Iran)
McQ, directed by John Sturges, starring John Wayne, Al Lettieri, Eddie Albert, Clu Gulager, Colleen Dewhurst, Diana Muldaur
Le meravigliose avventure di Zorro
The Middle of the World (Le Milieu du monde) – (France/Switzerland)
The Midnight Man, directed by and starring Burt Lancaster, with Susan Clark, Cameron Mitchell, Ed Lauter
The Missiles of October, made for TV, directed by Anthony Page, starring William Devane, Martin Sheen, Ralph Bellamy, Howard Da Silva, James Hong
Mr. Majestyk, directed by Richard Fleischer, starring Charles Bronson, Linda Cristal, Al Lettieri
Murder on the Orient Express, directed by Sidney Lumet, starring Albert Finney, Lauren Bacall, Sean Connery, Vanessa Redgrave, Ingrid Bergman, John Gielgud, Anthony Perkins, Richard Widmark – (U.K.)
My Little Loves (Mes Petites Amoureuses) – (France)

N
Newman's Law, starring George Peppard
The Night of the Scarecrow (A Noite do Espantalho) – (Brazil)
The Night Porter (Il Portiere di notte), directed by Liliana Cavani, starring Dirk Bogarde and Charlotte Rampling – (Italy)
The Nine Lives of Fritz the Cat, an adult animated film

O
The Odessa File, directed by Ronald Neame, starring Jon Voight, Maximilian Schell, Maria Schell – (U.K./West Germany)
One or the Other of Us, directed by Wolfgang Petersen, starring Jürgen Prochnow – (West Germany)
Orders (Les Ordres), starring Jean Lapointe – (Canada)

P
Parade, directed by and starring Jacques Tati – (France/Sweden)
The Parallax View, directed by Alan J. Pakula, starring Warren Beatty, Hume Cronyn, William Daniels, Paula Prentiss
Pastoral: To Die in the Country (Den-en ni shisu) – (Japan)
A Peasant on a Bicycle (Selyaninat s Koleloto), directed by Lyudmil Kirkov, starring Georgi Georgiev-Getz and Georgi Rusev – (Bulgaria)
The Phantom of Liberty (Le Fantôme de la liberté), directed by Luis Buñuel – (France)
Phantom of the Paradise, directed by Brian De Palma, starring William Finley, Paul Williams and Jessica Harper
Phase IV, directed by Saul Bass, starring Michael Murphy, Nigel Davenport and Lynne Frederick
La prima Angélica (a.k.a. Cousin Angelica), directed by Carlos Saura – (Spain)

Q
QB VII, mini-series for TV, starring Anthony Hopkins, Ben Gazzara, Lee Remick, Leslie Caron

R
The Red Snowball Tree (Kalina krasnaya) – (U.S.S.R.)
The Rehearsal (I Dokimi), directed by and starring Jules Dassin with Olympia Dukakis – (Greece)
Report to the Commissioner, starring Michael Moriarty and Yaphet Kotto
Return of the Street Fighter (Satsujin ken 2) – (Japan)
Rhinoceros, starring Gene Wilder and Zero Mostel

S
Sandakan No. 8 (Brothel 8) – (Japan)
The Sannikov Land (Zemlya Sannikova) – (U.S.S.R.)
Scent of a Woman (Profumo di donna), directed by Dino Risi, starring Vittorio Gassman – (Italy)
Sister Street Fighter (Onna Hissatsu Ken) – (Japan)
Sister Street Fighter: Hanging by a Thread (Onna hissatsu ken: kiki ippatsu) – (Japan)
Son of Dracula, starring Harry Nilsson and Ringo Starr – (U.K.)
The Spikes Gang, directed by Richard Fleischer, starring Lee Marvin, Ron Howard, Gary Grimes, Charles Martin Smith
S*P*Y*S, starring Donald Sutherland and Elliott Gould
Stardust, directed by Michael Apted, starring David Essex, Adam Faith and Larry Hagman – (U.K.)
Stavisky, directed by Alain Resnais, starring Jean-Paul Belmondo – (France/Italy)
Still Life (Tabiate bijan) – (Iran)
Stone, a cult Australian film
The Street Fighter (Gekitotsu! Satsujin Ken), starring Sonny Chiba – (Japan)
The Street Fighter's Last Revenge – (Japan)
The Sugarland Express, directed by Steven Spielberg, starring Goldie Hawn, William Atherton, Ben Johnson
The Super Cops, directed by Gordon Parks, starring Ron Leibman, David Selby, Sheila Frazier, Pat Hingle, Dan Frazer
Sweet Movie, directed by Dušan Makavejev – (Canada/France/West Germany)
Swept Away (Travolti da un insolito destino nell'azzurro mare d'agosto), starring Giancarlo Giannini and Mariangela Melato – (Italy)
The Swinging Cheerleaders, directed by Jack Hill, starring Colleen Camp, Cheryl Smith, Rosanne Katon
Symptoms, starring Angela Pleasence – (U.K.)

T
The Taking of Pelham One Two Three, directed by Joseph Sargent, starring Walter Matthau, Robert Shaw, Martin Balsam, Héctor Elizondo, Jerry Stiller
The Tamarind Seed, directed by Blake Edwards, starring Julie Andrews and Omar Sharif – (U.K./U.S.)
The Terminal Man, starring George Segal and Joan Hackett
The Texas Chain Saw Massacre, directed by Tobe Hooper, starring Marilyn Burns
That's Entertainment!, a documentary directed by Jack Haley Jr., featuring Frank Sinatra, Fred Astaire, Gene Kelly, Elizabeth Taylor, Bing Crosby, Mickey Rooney, Liza Minnelli
Thieves Like Us, directed by Robert Altman, starring Keith Carradine and Shelley Duvall
Thunderbolt and Lightfoot, directed by Michael Cimino, starring Clint Eastwood and Jeff Bridges
Torkaman by Amir Shervan (Iran)
The Towering Inferno, starring Steve McQueen, Paul Newman, William Holden, Faye Dunaway, Jennifer Jones, Robert Wagner, O. J. Simpson, Fred Astaire
Three Tough Guys, starring Lino Ventura, Fred Williamson, Isaac Hayes
Truck Turner, starring Isaac Hayes
The Traveler (Mossafer), directed by Abbas Kiarostami – (Iran)

U
The Ultimate Thrill, starring Barry Brown and Britt Ekland

V
Vampyres, starring Marianne Morris and Anulka – (U.K.)
Vase de Noces, directed by Thierry Zéno – (Belgium)

W
We All Loved Each Other So Much (C'eravamo tanto amati), directed by Ettore Scola, starring Stefania Sandrelli and Vittorio Gassman – (Italy)
Weighed But Found Wanting (Tinimbang Ka Ngunit Kulang) – (Philippines)
When the North Wind Blows, starring Dan Haggerty
Where the Lilies Bloom, starring Harry Dean Stanton
The White Dawn, starring Warren Oates, Louis Gossett Jr., Timothy Bottoms – (Canada)
Winnie the Pooh and Tigger Too (animated short)
A Woman Under the Influence, directed by John Cassavetes, starring Gena Rowlands (Golden Globe Award) and Peter Falk

Y
Young Frankenstein, directed by Mel Brooks, starring Gene Wilder, Marty Feldman, Teri Garr, Cloris Leachman, Madeline Kahn, Peter Boyle

Z
Zandy's Bride, starring Gene Hackman and Liv Ullmann
Zardoz, starring Sean Connery and Charlotte Rampling – (U.K.)

1974 Wide-release movies
United States unless stated

January–March

April–June

July–September

October–December

Births
January 1 – Jennifer Podemski, Canadian actress
January 5 – Daisy Bates, English actress
January 10
Jemaine Clement, New Zealand actor, musician, comedian, singer, director and writer
Hrithik Roshan, Indian actor
January 14 - Kevin Durand, Canadian actor
January 19 - Natassia Malthe, Norwegian actress and model
January 21 - Vincent Laresca, American actor
January 24 – Ed Helms, American actor and comedian
January 28 - Ty Olsson, Canadian actor
January 30 
Christian Bale, English actor
Olivia Colman, English actress
February 4 – Urmila Matondkar, Indian actress
February 8
Seth Green, American actor, voice artist, comedian, producer, writer and director
Susan May Pratt, American actress
February 9 
Erra Fazira, Malaysian actress
Amber Valletta, American model and actress
February 10
Elizabeth Banks, American actress, director, writer and producer
María Botto, Argentine-Spanish actress
February 15 – Miranda July (née Grossinger), American filmmaker, performance artist and fiction writer
February 16 – Mahershala Ali, American actor and rapper
February 17
David Lipper, Canadian actor
Jerry O'Connell, American actor
February 18 – Nadine Labaki, Lebanese actress, director and activist
February 25 – Divya Bharti, Indian actress (d. 1993)
March 5
Kevin Connolly (actor), American actor and director
Matt Lucas, English actor, comedian, writer and television presenter
Eva Mendes, American actress
March 8 – Cesar Velasco Broca, Spanish actor and cult filmmaker
March 15 - Renoly Santiago, Puerto Rican actor, singer and writer
March 21 - Rhys Darby, New Zealand actor, comedian and voice actor
March 23 - Randall Park, American actor, comedian and writer
March 24 – Alyson Hannigan, American actress
March 25 - Laz Alonso, American actor
March 31 - Victoria Smurfit, Irish actress
April 2 - Harold Hunter, American professional skateboarder and actor (d. 2006)
April 10 - Omar Metwally, American actor
April 12 - Marley Shelton, American actress
April 15
Fay Masterson, English actress
Danny Pino, American actor
April 21 - John Hasler, English actor and voice-over artist
April 24 – Jennifer Paz, Filipino actress
April 26 – Ivana Miličević, American actress
April 28 – Penélope Cruz, Spanish actress
May 2 - Matt Berry, English actor, voice actor, comedian, writer and musician
May 3 - Joseph Kosinski, American filmmaker
May 7 – Breckin Meyer, American actor, voice actor, writer and producer
May 10 - Craig Hall (actor), New Zealand actor
May 11 – Benoît Magimel, French actor
May 15 – Russell Hornsby, American actor
May 21 – Fairuza Balk, American actress
May 22 – Sean Gunn, American actor
May 24 - Dash Mihok, American actor and director
May 25 - Maria Fernanda Cândido, Brazilian actress and television presenter
June 6 - Danny Strong, American actor, writer, director and producer
June 12
Jared Bush, American screenwriter, producer and director
Jason Mewes, American actor, comedian, film producer and podcaster
June 14 - Phillip Rhys, English actor and filmmaker
June 16 - Joseph May, British-born Canadian-American actor
June 20 – Lenin M. Sivam, Sri Lankan-Canadian director, producer, and screenwriter
June 23 – Joel Edgerton, Australian actor
June 25
Jeff Cohen (actor), American former child actor
Karisma Kapoor, Indian actress
July 4 - Mick Wingert, American voice actor
July 8 – Tami Erin, American actress
July 20 - Simon Rex, American actor, rapper and comedian
July 22
Donald Faison, American actor, comedian and voice actor
Franka Potente, German actress
Johnny Strong, American actor, musician and singer-songwriter
July 30 – Hilary Swank, American actress
July 31
Emilia Fox, English actress and presenter
Asher Keddie, Australian actress
August 5 – Kajol, Indian actress
August 7 – Michael Shannon, American actor
August 8 - Enzo Cilenti, English actor
August 10 - Craig Kirkwood, American former actor
August 11 - Chris Messina, American actor, director, writer and producer
August 15 – Natasha Henstridge, Canadian actress and model
August 20
Amy Adams, American actress
Misha Collins, American actor
August 23 – Ray Park, English actor
August 31 - Marc Webb, American music video director and filmmaker
September 1 - Burn Gorman, English actor and musician
September 5 - Romina Yan, Argentine actress, screenwriter and singer (d. 2010)
September 6 - Sarah Danielle Madison, American actress (d. 2014)
September 7 - Noah Huntley, English actor
September 10 – Ryan Phillippe, American actor
September 11 - Ben Best, American actor, writer, musician and producer (d. 2021)
September 18 - Xzibit, American rapper, actor and broadcaster
September 19
Jimmy Fallon, American television host, comedian and actor
Victoria Silvstedt, Swedish actress and model
September 30 - Ashley Hamilton, American actor, comedian and singer-songwriter
October 2 - Michelle Krusiec, American actress, writer and producer
October 6
Fernando Chien, Taiwanese actor and stunt performer
Jeremy Sisto, American actor, producer and writer
October 7 - Numan Acar, Turkish-German actor and producer
October 17 – Matthew Macfadyen, English actor
October 20 – Brian Limond, Scottish comedian, actor and writer
October 28
Michael Dougherty, American director, screenwriter, producer and animator
Jake Kasdan, American filmmaker and actor
Joaquin Phoenix, American actor
October 31 - David Dencik, Danish-Swedish actor
November 2 - Nelly, American actor, rapper and singer
November 4 – Matthew Rhys, Welsh actor
November 10 – Simone Singh, Indian actress
November 11 – Leonardo DiCaprio, American actor
November 14 - David Moscow, American actor and producer
November 16 – Chloë Sevigny, American actress
November 17 – Leslie Bibb, American actress and model
November 21 – Tiit Sukk, Estonian actor
November 24 - Stephen Merchant, English comedian, actor, writer, director and presenter
November 26 - Omar Chaparro, Mexican actor, comedian, television host and singer
December 1 – Érica Rivas, Argentinian actress
December 11 - Lisa Ortiz, American voice actress and voice director
December 17 
Sarah Paulson, American actress
Giovanni Ribisi, American actor
December 24 - Thure Lindhardt, Danish actor
December 25
Patrick Brennan (actor), American actor
Andrew McNee, Canadian actor
December 27 - Masi Oka, Japanese actor, producer and digital effects artist
December 29 - Mekhi Phifer, American actor

Deaths

Film debuts 
Armand Assante – The Lords of Flatbush
Richard Belzer –  The Groove Tube
Tom Bower – The Trial of Billy Jack
Tony Burton – The Black Godfather
Chevy Chase – The Groove Tube
Bill Cobbs – The Taking of Pelham One Two Three
Robert Englund – Buster and Billie
Jeff Goldblum – Death Wish
Clyde Kusatsu – Airport 1975
Edward James Olmos – Black Fist
Joe Pantoliano – Road Movie
Peter Simonischek – Die Auslieferung
Fred Ward – Ginger in the Morning
Kenneth Welsh – Piaf
Henry Winkler – Crazy Joe

References

 
Film by year